Joaquim "Quim" Araújo Delgado (born 10 March 1988) is a Spanish footballer who plays for Águilas FC as a forward.

Club career
Born in Barcelona, Catalonia, Araújo made his debut as a senior with CF Badalona's reserves in 2007, in the regional leagues. After subsequently representing UDA Gramenet B, he signed for Tercera División side CF Montañesa in July 2009.

Araújo first arrived in Segunda División B on 1 July 2011, after agreeing to a contract with UE Sant Andreu. On 8 July 2014, after being an undisputed starter, he moved to fellow league team SD Compostela.

On 24 July 2015 Araújo joined CD Eldense, still in the third division. The following 29 January he signed for another reserve team, Valencia CF Mestalla in the same category, for €25,000.

On 3 July 2017, after impressing with Mestalla in the 2017 Segunda División B play-offs, Araújo agreed to a contract with Albacete Balompié, newly promoted to Segunda División. He made his professional debut on 20 August, coming on as a late substitute for Jon Erice.

Araújo scored his first professional goal on 24 September 2017, netting the winner in a 2–1 home defeat of Real Oviedo. The following 31 January, he signed a two-and-a-half-year contract with fellow league team Córdoba CF.

On 19 July 2019, Araújo signed a one-year deal with FC Cartagena in division three, after cutting ties with the Blanquiverdes.

References

External links
 

1988 births
Living people
Footballers from Barcelona
Spanish footballers
Association football forwards
Segunda División players
Segunda División B players
Tercera División players
Divisiones Regionales de Fútbol players
UDA Gramenet footballers
CF Montañesa players
UE Sant Andreu footballers
SD Compostela footballers
CD Eldense footballers
Valencia CF Mestalla footballers
Albacete Balompié players
Córdoba CF players
FC Cartagena footballers
Lleida Esportiu footballers
Águilas FC players